This article details the qualifying phase for shooting at the 2016 Summer Olympics. 366 quota places for the Games are entitled to the shooters coming from their respective NOCs, based on the results at designated ISSF supervised Championships subjected to the ISSF rules from August 1, 2014, to March 31, 2016, while the remaining twenty-four are available to the eligible NOCs under the Tripartite Commission Invitation to get a total quota of 390. Host nation Brazil has been guaranteed nine quota places with one in each of the following events: 50 m rifle prone, 25 m rapid fire pistol, 10 m air pistol (both men and women), 10 m air rifle (women), trap (both men and women), and skeet (both men and women).

Quota places can be obtained at the 2014 and 2015 ISSF World Championships, the 2015 ISSF World Cup series, and the designated Continental Championships or Games during the qualifying period.

Summary

Qualification timeline

* The Asian Championships were scheduled to take place on November 1 to 12, 2015 in Kuwait City, Kuwait, and served as a final Olympic qualifier for the aforementioned continent, but the IOC had stripped the nation of its rights and revoked the Olympic qualifying status of the competition, following the Kuwait NOC's suspension for government interference and the denial of visa for the ISSF technical delegate from Israel.

50 m rifle three positions men

50 m rifle prone men

10 m air rifle men

50 m pistol men

25 m rapid fire pistol men

10 m air pistol men

Trap men

Double trap men

Skeet men

50 m rifle three positions women

10 m air rifle women

25 m pistol women

10 m air pistol women

Trap women

Skeet women

Notes
 Sanjeev Rajput secured a second quota place for India in the men's 50 m rifle positions, but the slot was occupied by Gagan Narang as a double starter based on his cumulative scores at the national selection trials. As a result, the NRAI decided to exchange it with an additional men's trap spot, which was awarded to Manavjit Singh Sandhu.
 A total of eighteen shooters were provisionally named to the Chinese team, including two double starters, at the end of Olympic trials for rifle and shooting. As per ISSF rules, China had decided to exchange one of them with the men's 50 m rifle prone spot, which was awarded to Zhao Shengbo. Hence, the remaining berth was returned to ISSF for reallocation.
 Host nation Brazil had been awarded a minimum of nine quota places in select events with only six shooters using the vacancies for the Games. Almeida Wu and Rippel attained a direct nomination to the Olympic team to leave the vacancies unused for reallocation. With a lack of shooters in women's 10 m air pistol, the Brazilian Shooting Federation decided to exchange it with the men's 50 m pistol, which was awarded to Júlio Almeida.
 Slovakia secured a quota place in the women's trap at the 2015 European Shooting Championships, but Zuzana Štefečeková withdrew from the Games due to her pregnancy. Instead, Slovak Olympic Committee chose to exchange it with an additional spot in its counterpart based on performances throughout the qualifying period. The slot was occupied by Marián Kovačócy.
 Sweden secured a quota place in the women's 10 m air rifle at the 2015 ISSF World Cup meet in Changwon, but the Swedish Olympic Committee chose to exchange it with the men's double trap instead based on performances throughout the qualifying period. The slot was occupied by London 2012 silver medalist Håkan Dahlby.
 Qatar secured a quota place in the men's 50 m rifle 3 positions at the 2016 Asian Olympic Qualifying Tournament in Delhi, but the Qatar Olympic Committee chose to exchange it with an additional spot in the men's skeet instead based on performances throughout the qualifying period. The slot was occupied by five-time Olympian and London 2012 bronze medalist Nasser Al-Attiyah.
 Australia secured a quota place in the women's 50 m rifle 3 positions at the 2016 Oceania Championships in Sydney, but Shooting Australia, in conjunction with the Australian Olympic Committee, chose to exchange it with the women's skeet instead based on performances throughout the qualifying period and selection trials. The slot was occupied by Aislin Jones.
 Slovenia secured a quota place in the women's 10 m air pistol at the 2014 ISSF World Championships in Granada, Spain, but the Slovenian Olympic Committee chose to exchange it with the women's rifle events instead based on performances throughout the qualifying period. The slot was occupied by London 2012 Olympian Živa Dvoršak.
 Two shooters secured quota places (won by Petra Lustenberger and Jasmin Michler) for Switzerland in the women's rifle events, but both of these places were occupied by Nina Christen as a double starter. Therefore, the Swiss Olympic Association decided to exchange one of them with the men's 50 m rifle three positions, which was awarded to Jan Lochbichler.
 Two shooters secured quota places (won by Beate Gauss and Sonja Pfeilschifter) for Germany in the women's rifle events, but both of these places were occupied by Barbara Engleder as a double starter. Therefore, the German Shooting Federation had decided to exchange one of them with the women's 25 m pistol which was awarded to Monika Karsch.
 Italy secured an additional quota place in the men's 50 m pistol at the 2015 European Shooting Championships, but the Italian Olympic Committee and the Italian Sport Shooting Federation (UITS) chose to exchange it with the men's 25 m rapid fire pistol instead based on performances throughout the qualifying period. The slot was occupied by Riccardo Mazzetti.
 Kim Cheong-yong secured a second quota place for Korea in the men's 10 m air pistol, but the slot was occupied by Jin Jong-oh as a double starter based on his cumulative scores at the national selection trials. As a result, the Korean Shooting Federation decided to exchange it with an additional women's 10 m air rifle spot, which was awarded to Park Hae-mi.
 Kazakhstan secured a quota place in the men's trap at the 2015 Asia Olympic Qualifying Competition and exchanged it for a women's trap quota place. The slot was occupied by Mariya Dmitriyenko.
 Nourhan Amer secured a quota place for Egypt in the women's 50 m rifle three positions, but her quota place was exchanged for a second place in the men's trap, which was awarded to Ahmed Kamar.

References

Qualification for the 2016 Summer Olympics
Qualification